Konstantin (Konsta) Evert Lindqvist (former Kraft) (26 December 1877, in Kymi − 31 August 1920, in Saint Petersburg) was a locomotive driver and member of the Social Democratic Party of Finland party and a delegate for transport in the Finnish People's Delegation the government of the Finnish Socialist Workers' Republic during the Finnish Civil War period. After the war Lindqvist fled to Russia where he died two years later.

Lindqvist worked in the Finnish State Railways as a locomotive engineer, driving in Kajaani from 1908–1909 and in Kuopio from 1910–1918.

Lindqvist was a member of the Parliament from July to October 1917 from the Kuopio western constituency. Lindqvist became a member of parliament when the MP Otto Piisinen became ill and left Parliament.

Lindqvist was also district secretary of the Kajaani social democratic group and chairman of the Finnish Locomotive Drivers Union from 1917 to 1918.

After the Finnish civil war Lindqvist fled to Russia where he became a member of the Communist Party's industrial committee and was a member of the party's military organization.

Lindqvist was shot on 31 August 1920 in Petrograd during the Kuusinen Club Incident. He was buried at the Monument to the Fighters of the Revolution on the Field of Mars in Saint Petersburg.

Lindqvist was married from 1903 to Anna Siviä Backman.

1877 births
1920 deaths
People from Kotka
People from Viipuri Province (Grand Duchy of Finland)
Social Democratic Party of Finland politicians
Communist Party of Finland politicians
Members of the Parliament of Finland (1916–17)
Finnish trade union leaders
People of the Finnish Civil War (Red side)
Finnish murder victims
Finnish people murdered abroad
People murdered in the Soviet Union
Burials on the Field of Mars (Saint Petersburg)